The DISER Lilith is a custom built workstation computer based on the Advanced Micro Devices (AMD) 2901 bit slicing processor, created by a group led by Niklaus Wirth at ETH Zürich. The project began in 1977, and by 1984 several hundred workstations were in use. It has a high resolution full page portrait oriented cathode ray tube display, a mouse, a laser printer interface, and a computer networking interface. Its software is written fully in Modula-2 and includes a relational database program named Lidas.

The Lilith processor architecture is a stack machine. Citing from Sven Erik Knudsen's contribution to "The Art of Simplicity": "Lilith's clock speed was around 7 MHz and enabled Lilith to execute between 1 and 2 million instructions (called M-code) per second. (...) Initially, the main memory was planned to have 65,536 16-bit words memory, but soon after its first version, it was enlarged to twice that capacity. For regular Modula-2 programs however, only the initial 65,536 words were usable for storage of variables."

History
The development of Lilith was influenced by the Xerox Alto from the Xerox PARC (1973) where Niklaus Wirth spent a sabbatical from 1976 to 1977. Unable to bring back one of the Alto systems to Europe, Wirth decided to build a new system from scratch between 1978 and 1980, selling it under the company name DISER (Data Image Sound Processor and Emitter Receiver System). In 1985, he had a second sabbatical leave to PARC, which led to the design of the Oberon System. Ceres, the follow-up to Lilith, was released in 1987.

Operating system

The Lilith operating system (OS), named Medos-2, was developed at ETH Zurich, by Svend Erik Knudsen with advice from Wirth. It is a single user, object-oriented operating system built from modules of Modula-2.

Its design influenced design of the OS Excelsior, developed for the Soviet Kronos workstation (see below), by the Kronos Research Group (KRG).

Soviet variants
From 1986 into the early 1990s, Soviet Union technologists created and produced a line of printed circuit board systems, and workstations based on them, all named Kronos. The workstations were based on Lilith, and made in small numbers.

Mouse
The computer mouse of the Lilith was custom-designed, and later used with the Smaky computers. It then inspired the first mice produced by Logitech.

References

External links

 Documentation on BitSavers
 Geissman, L et al. (August 1982) Lilith Handbook
 Wirth, N (1981) The Personal Computer Lilith
 Emulith emulator for the Lilith, homepage and documentation
 Lilith and Modula-2
 ETHistory - Lilith Workstation
 AMD AM2901DC entry on CPU World

Computer workstations
Computers using bit-slice designs
High-level language computer architecture